Harry Thomas may refer to:

Sports
Harry Thomas (rugby league), New Zealand rugby league footballer of the 1920s
Harry Thomas (footballer) (1901–?), Welsh football striker
Henry Thomas (boxer) (1888–1963), British bantamweight boxer

Politicians
Harry Thomas Jr. (born 1960), politician in Washington, D.C.
Harry Thomas Sr. (1922–1999), politician in Washington, D.C.
Harry K. Thomas Jr. (born 1956), American diplomat

Others
 Harry Thomas (1909–1996) Hollywood make-up man who worked on films directed by Ed Wood, Roger Corman and many others
Harry Thomas (bishop) (1897–1955), Bishop of Taunton
 (1945–1991), a Dutch music producer and impresario

See also
Harold Thomas (disambiguation)
Henry Thomas (disambiguation)